Rodnikovsky District is an administrative and municipal district (raion), one of the twenty-one in Ivanovo Oblast, Russia. It is located in the center of the oblast. Its administrative center is the town of Rodniki. Population:   38,667 (2002 Census);  The population of Rodniki accounts for 78.9% of the district's total population.

Administrative and municipal status
The town of Rodniki serves as the administrative center of the district. Prior to the adoption of the Law #145-OZ On the Administrative-Territorial Division of Ivanovo Oblast in December 2010, it was administratively incorporated separately from the district. Municipally, Rodniki is incorporated within Rodnikovsky Municipal District as Rodnikovskoye Urban Settlement.

References

Notes

Sources

Districts of Ivanovo Oblast

